Wulfhelm II was the fourth Anglo-Saxon Bishop of Wells. He was consecrated in 938, and died around 956.

Citations

References

External links
 

Bishops of Wells
10th-century English bishops
950s deaths
Year of death uncertain
Year of birth unknown